Breasted may refer to:
James Henry Breasted, American archaeologist and historian
Single-breasted, garment such as coat or jacket with one column of buttons
Double-breasted, garment such as coat or jacket with two columns of buttons